Bass Outlaws was a Miami bass music group that released their first album in 1992 on Newtown Records. Bass Outlaws released 4 studio albums. Their first album Illegal Bass peaked at 48 on the Billboard charts.

Discography

Studio albums

References

American electronic music groups
American electro musicians